Grevillea glossadenia is a species of flowering plant in the family Proteaceae and is endemic to Queensland, in northeastern Australia. It is an erect shrub with more or less elliptic leaves and deep yellow-orange to orange-red flowers.

Description
The lower surface of the leaves is silky-hairy.

Taxonomy
Grevillea glossadenia was first formally described in 1975 by Donald McGillivray in the journal Telopea from plant material collected by Bernard Hyland from near Bakerville (near Irvinebank) in 1972.

Distribution and habitat
This grevillea grows in woodland or open forest mainly between Walkamin, Irvinbank and Herberton.

Conservation status
This species is listed as a "vulnerable" under the Queensland Government Nature Conservation Act 1992.

Cultivation
Grevillea glossadenia is cultivated as an ornamental plant. It is suitable for use in small gardens as a shrub or small tree, where it grows readily in a sunny position with good drainage. It is frost hardy and tolerates humidity. The cultivar — Grevillea 'Orange Marmalade' was produced by crossing this species with Grevillea venusta.

References

glossadenia
Flora of Queensland
Proteales of Australia
Plants described in 1975
Vulnerable flora of Australia
Garden plants of Australia
Taxa named by Donald McGillivray